Thorn House or Thorne House may refer to:

A thorn house, another name for a Graduation tower

Places
in the United States (by state)
Thorn-Stingley House, Homer, Alaska, listed on the NRHP in Kenai Peninsula Borough, Alaska
Thorn House (San Andreas, California), listed on the National Register of Historic Places in Calaveras County, California
Parson Thorne Mansion, Milford, Delaware, listed on the NRHP in Kent County, Delaware
George R. Thorne House, Midlothian, Illinois, listed on the NRHP in Cook County, Illinois 
Thorn House (Alberton, Montana), listed on the National Register of Historic Places in Mineral County, Montana
Thorne and Eddy Estates, Morristown, New Jersey, listed on the NRHP in Morris County, New Jersey

See also
W. T. Thorne Building, Minden, Nebraska, listed on the NRHP in Kearney County, Nebraska